Leevi Aaltonen (born January 24, 2001) is a Finnish ice hockey winger who plays for KooKoo  in Liiga.  He played in 7 games for KalPa in 2018–19 with no goals and one assist.  He was drafted by the New York Rangers in the 5th round of the 2019 NHL Entry Draft with the 130th pick in the draft.

Career statistics

Regular season and playoffs

International

References

External links

2001 births
Living people
Finnish ice hockey right wingers
Iisalmen Peli-Karhut players
KalPa players
New York Rangers draft picks
People from Mikkeli
Sportspeople from South Savo